Thierry Ndikumwenayo (born 26 March 1997) is a Spanish-Burundian long-distance runner, most well-known for his cross-country running results.

Biography

Junior Athlete (- 2016) 
Ndikumwenayo was introduced to athletics in 2012 by a friend, who challenged him to a race. By 2014, as a 17-year-old, he won the silver medal in the boys' 3000 metres event at the 2014 Summer Youth Olympics held in Nanjing, China. After that performance, he was invited to train in Spain as part of a project offering opportunities to Burundian and Sudanese runners. He subsequently became a member of Playas de Castellon athletics club, who paid for his accommodation. During this time, he continued representing Burundi, coming 7th in 5000m at the 2015 African Junior Championships, and 9th in the 2015 All-Africa Games. In 2016, he came 7th in the 5000m at the African Championships, and ran 28:14 for 4th at the 10km Corrida de Houilles.

2017 - 2021 
Ndikumwenayo's 2017 season included his first taste of international cross country racing, placing 95th in the senior men's race at the 2017 IAAF World Cross Country Championships held in Kampala, Uganda. He also ran a then personal best 5000m time at the Gala dei Casteilli in Bellinzona (13:25.55). 

In 2018, Ndikumwenayo competed at his first world indoor championships. He went out in his 3000m heat. He also competed at the ECCC Championships, winning the 5000m and coming second over 3000m for Playas de Castellon.

In 2019, he competed in the senior men's race at the 2019 IAAF World Cross Country Championships held in Aarhus, Denmark, finishing in 9th place, an improvement of 86 places on two years earlier. This performance qualified him for the 2019 World Athletics Championships held in Doha, Qatar, but he did not finish his race in the 10000m. Later that year, he won the men's race at the Cross Internacional de la Constitución held in Alcobendas, Spain.

His 2020 and 2021 seasons were both curtailed by the implications of the COVID-19 Pandemic, which meant that he did not race outside of the Iberian Peninsula. During this period, he set a marginal PB over 5000m with 13:25.30, and won the 2021 Almond Blossom Cross Country. In the latter part of 2021, however, he failed to display much form in cross country; his best place was 6th in the Cross de Atapuerca, and he came a disappointing 36th at the Cross Internacional de Italica, held in Santiponce, Sevilla.

2022 - Present 
2022 was Ndikumwenayo's breakthrough season. He started the year with a 10km PB in Castellon of 28:04, and went on to win the Gran Premio Campo a Traves in Serradilla, Spain. He ran as a pacemaker in the Barcelona Half Marathon and Madrid Marathon. Ndikumwenayo began his track season in May at the Desafio Nerja, and ran a near-19 second 5000m personal best of 13:06.58. Three weeks later, he marginally improved his best time over the distance at the Meeting Iberoamericano in Huelva, placing third in 13:06.46. The improvements in his times and performances gained him an entry to the Golden Gala Pietro Mennea in Rome (his first Diamond League race), where he ran a PB and NR of 12:59.39 for 8th. He raced several more times on the Diamond League circuit over the course of that year: he was 2nd at the Meeting de Paris 5000m (13:05.24) and finished 5th over 3000m at the Bauhaus-Galan (7:34.91 PB), before suffering an injury setback which ruled him out of the 2022 World Athletics Championships in Oregon.  He later shocked an incredible field to win his first ever Diamond League race in the Herculis 3000m. He ran a Burundian national record, a world-leading time, and Diamond League record to win in 7:25.94. He came 11th in the 5000m at the Memorial Van Damme (13:10.71), and competed in the Weltklasse Zurich Diamond League Final, but did not finish the race. His 2022 cross country season began with 3 successive victories in the Cross Internacional de Soria, Cross de Atapuerca and Cross de Italica, at about which time he gained Spanish citizenship.

References

External links 
 

Living people
1997 births
Place of birth missing (living people)
Burundian male long-distance runners
Burundian male cross country runners
World Athletics Championships athletes for Burundi
Athletes (track and field) at the 2014 Summer Youth Olympics
21st-century Burundian people